Tomlinson Run is a  long 3rd order tributary to the Ohio River in Hancock County, West Virginia.  This is the only stream of this name in the United States.

Variant names
According to the Geographic Names Information System, it has also been known historically as:
Tomlinsons Creek

Course
Tomlinson Run rises about 1.5 miles northwest of New Manchester, West Virginia, in Hancock County and then flows generally west to join the Ohio River at Moscow.

Watershed
Tomlinson Run drains  of area, receives about 38.1 in/year of precipitation, has a wetness index of 323.15, and is about 64% forested.

See also
List of rivers of West Virginia

References

Rivers of West Virginia
Rivers of Hancock County, West Virginia
Tributaries of the Ohio River